Leon Rutherford Taylor (October 26, 1883 – April 1, 1924) was an American politician who was the acting governor of New Jersey from October 28, 1913, to January 20, 1914. Taylor took office upon the resignation of James Fairman Fielder, who had stepped down to create a vacancy in the governorship and avoid constitutional limits on succeeding himself.

Biography
Taylor was born in Asbury Park, New Jersey on October 26, 1883. He attended Denison University in Ohio, studied law and established himself as a lawyer in New Jersey. Taylor was elected to three terms in the New Jersey General Assembly, and was chosen as its speaker. After Governor of New Jersey James Fairman Fielder resigned from office on October 28, 1913, Taylor became acting governor by virtue of his role as speaker of the house, serving until January 20, 1914, when Fielder assumed a full term in office. Taylor died on April 1, 1924, in Denver, Colorado. He was never married and has no child.

References

External links
New Jersey History Facts

1883 births
1924 deaths
Democratic Party governors of New Jersey
Speakers of the New Jersey General Assembly
Democratic Party members of the New Jersey General Assembly
People from Asbury Park, New Jersey
Baptists from New Jersey
20th-century American politicians
Denison University alumni
New Jersey lawyers
20th-century American lawyers
19th-century American lawyers
19th-century Baptists
20th-century Baptists